Samdech Preah Agga Maha Sangharajadhipati Tep Vong (born 12 January 1932) is a Cambodian Buddhist monk, currently the Great Supreme Patriarch of Cambodia, known for his role in re-establishing the Cambodian monkhood after the Pol Pot period and for his links to dominant political leaders since the 1980s.

Biography 
He was born at Trapeang Chork village, Chreav commune, Siem Reap district, and at the age of 10 went to study at Wat Reach Bo in the provincial capital of Siem Reap.  At the age of 16 he ordained as a novice at the same temple, but because of family duties only initially assumed robes for nine months. His preceptor was Ven. Hing Mao, the abbot of the temple. At the age of 21 he ordained as a bhikkhu at the temple with the same preceptor. He was made kru sotr, or second-ranking monk of the temple in 1956. Like almost all Cambodian monks, he was forced to leave the monkhood during the 1975-9 Pol Pot period. He was the youngest of seven senior monks re-ordained in a state-sponsored ceremony on September 19, 1979 in order to create a core of ordained monks who could go on to ordain others and formally re-establish the Cambodian sangha, which had been nearly destroyed by the Khmer Rouge. The new monastic lineage was not to make the distinction between Mahanikay and Dhammayut orders which had existed prior to the Pol Pot period.

Like most of the other monks ordained in the September 19 ceremony, Tep Vong had already resumed the life of a monk, probably in June, 1979.  He represented the new People's Republic of Kampuchea (PRK) government as a monk on trips to Mongolia and the Soviet Union that year. He wore robes in August, 1979, when he gave evidence at the trial in absentia of Pol Pot and other Khmer Rouge leaders, testifying that in a single commune agents of the Khmer Rouge had executed 57 monks, including three of Tep Vong's own nephews.  He also testified to having been put to hard labor during the nearly four years of the Khmer Rouge.

Following the September 19, 1979 ordination, he was made viney thor, meaning that he was in charge of discipline for the monkhood. At first, the oldest of the seven re-ordained monks, Kaet Vay, assumed the role of preceptor in the frequent ceremonies to ordain monks in the official lineage.  For reasons of age, Kaet Vay discontinued this by 1981, and Tep Vong assumed this role. At this time, in effect, Tep Vong became the leader of the Unified Cambodian Buddhist Sangha. Instead of a Ministry of Religion, as existed before 1975, in PRK religious institutions were under the authority of the Solidarity Front for the Construction and Defence of the Motherland of Kampuchea, usually just called The Front.  Tep Vong was one of the original members of the Front's central committee. In May, 1981, he was also elected a member of the National Assembly.

The socialist People's Republic of Kampuchea did not use the term sangharaja, although the term is sometimes used to describe his position of leadership in the 1980s. He remained the sole leader of Cambodian Buddhism until 1991.  Following the 1991 Paris Peace Accords on October 23, which made former king Norodom Sihanouk head of state, the monkhood was once again divided into Mahanikay and Dhammayut orders. Royal titles were also re-introduced in the monkhood. On Nov. 8, 1991, in an official proclamation signed by Sihanouk, Tep Vong was given the title Samdech Preah Mahasomedhadhipati, and a week later, on Nov. 15, was named sangaraja of the Mahanikay Order.   Venerable Bour Kry was appointed sangharaja of the Dhammayut Order by Sihanouk on Dec. 7. Tep Vong became an ex oficio member of the Cambodian Throne Council on September 23, 1993.

In 2006, Tep Vong was elevated to the title of Samdech Preah Agga Mahā Sangharājādhipati, or Great Supreme Patriarch, placing him at the head of the two orders. He is the first monk in over 150 years to receive this title.

Political Role 
While President of the Unified Sangha, Tep Vong put forth the argument that certain forms of political violence could be condoned by Buddhism.

Venerable Tep Vong has been previously criticized by younger members of the sangha for his ties to the government of Vietnam, and with for being close to the leadership of the CPP (Cambodian People's Party) which dominates the government.  He has come into conflict with younger members of the sangha who have voiced opposition to government policies and corruption, on one occasion calling publicly for the arrest of the organizers of an anti-government protest.

He is also a member of the Royal Council of the Throne of Cambodia.

Statements on HIV/AIDS 
Venerable Tep Vong has spoken out on several occasions regarding issues surrounding the HIV/AIDS situation in Cambodia, in particular following a 2000 conference organized for monks by the National AIDS Authority.  Tep Vong has stated that he believes that Cambodia's HIV/AIDS problem has been overstated by Cambodia's enemies in order to discredit the ruling government.  He has also stated that HIV/AIDS is a form of karmic punishment that is best dealt with by cracking down on prostitution, and that monks should not take any role in treating HIV/AIDS patients, nor in disseminating HIV education.  Certain elements of the Mohanikaya have attempted to position monks as conduits for educational materials regarding HIV/AIDS, a position opposed by Tep Vong.

Notes

References 
 
 
 Corfield, Justin and Laura Summers (2003) Historical Dictionary of Cambodia. Lanham, Maryland:  The Scarecrow Press.  
 
 

Marston, John A. (2009)  "Cambodian Religion since 1989."  In Beyond Democracy in Cambodia: Political Reconstruction in a Post-Conflict Society, J. Ojendal and M. Lilja, eds.  Copenhagen: NIAS Press.  
 
 

 Vickery, Michael (1986) Kampuchea: politics, economics and Society. Boulder, CO: Lynne Rienner.

1932 births
Living people
Theravada Buddhist monks
Cambodian Buddhist monks
Cambodian Theravada Buddhists